Adrian Bassett (born 11 March 1967) is a former Australian rules footballer who played for the Carlton Football Club in the Australian Football League (AFL).

Notes

External links

Adrian Basset's profile at Blueseum

1967 births
Carlton Football Club players
Coburg Football Club players
Australian rules footballers from Victoria (Australia)
Living people
Southport Australian Football Club players